Kanana is a township near the city of Orkney in Dr Kenneth Kaunda District Municipality in the North West province of South Africa.

References

Populated places in the City of Matlosana Local Municipality
Townships in North West (South African province)